Xiaoxing Xi (born 1957) is a Chinese-born American physicist. He is the Laura H. Carnell Professor and former chair at the Physics Department of Temple University in Philadelphia. In May 2015, the United States Department of Justice arrested him on charges of having sent restricted American technology to China. All charges against him were dropped in September 2015.

Career
Xi was born in China and received his Ph.D. from Peking University in 1987. He was a researcher at the Karlsruhe Nuclear Research Center in Germany, and moved to the United States in 1989. In the US he worked at Bell Communication Research at Rutgers University and the University of Maryland, before becoming a faculty member of Pennsylvania State University in 1995. He has since naturalized as a US citizen. Xi's wife is also a physics professor, who teaches at Pennsylvania State University. They have two daughters and live in suburban Philadelphia. He was named chairman of Temple University's physics department in 2014.

Honors
 The National Science Foundation's Career Award (1997)
 Chang Jiang Scholar (2006), bestowed by the Chinese Ministry of Education and the Li Ka Shing Foundation
 Fellow of the American Physical Society (2007)

False accusation of spying
In 2015, police raided the home of physics professor Xi Xiaoxing and arrested him at gunpoint in front of his wife and 2 daughters. The US Justice Department (DOJ) had accused the scientist of illegally sending trade secrets to China: specifically, the design of a pocket heater used in superconductor research, threatening him with 80 years in prison and $1 million in fines. The scientist's daughter Joyce Xi said, "newscasters surrounded our home and tried to film through windows. The FBI rummaged through all our belongings and carried off electronics and documents containing many private details of our lives. For months, we lived in fear of FBI intimidation and surveillance. We worried about our safety in public, given that my dad’s face was plastered all over the news. My dad was unable to work, and his reputation was shattered."

Temple University forced the professor to take administrative leave and suspended him as chair of the Physics Department. He was also banned from accessing his lab or communicating with his students directly. It was later learned that FBI agents had been listening to his phone calls and reading his emails for months — possibly years.

In September 2015, however, the DOJ dropped all charges against him after leading scientists, including a co-inventor of the pocket heater, provided affidavits that the schematics that Xi shared with Chinese scientists were not for a pocket heater or other restricted technology. According to Xi's lawyer Peter Zeidenberg, the government did not understand the complicated science and failed to consult with experts before arresting him. He said that the information Xi shared as part of "typical academic collaboration" was about a different device, which Xi co-invented and which is not restricted technology.

Suit against the government
Xi sued the United States and the FBI agents over violations of fourth and fifth amendment rights. The suit alleges that Xi was surveilled without a warrant and the FBI knowingly made false claims.
In 2021, Xi a Philadelphia court rejected his legal claims for damages. The judge ruled that the claims involved matters of discretion and judgement of the defendants. Xi's appeal was argued in Sept, 2022. However recent Supreme Court decisions will make it difficult to obtain damages for violations of constitutional rights.

Works
Xiaoxing Xi has published more than 300 research papers and holds three patents. His research focus is on materials physics, specifically the applications of epitaxial thin films and nanoscale heterostructures. His key publications include:

 .
 .
 .
 .
 .

References

External links
Xiaoxing Xi legal defense fund

1958 births
Living people
21st-century American physicists
Temple University faculty
Chinese emigrants to the United States
Chinese physicists
Peking University alumni
Pennsylvania State University faculty
People with acquired American citizenship
Fellows of the American Physical Society